Deepak Chopra's India Authentic is a series of one-shot comic books from Virgin Comics which re-tell the iconic myths and legends of India for a global audience. The series has been created by Deepak Chopra (with Saurav Mohapatra), who also presents the foreword for each issue.  The first five issues were collected as the 'Book of Shiva'.  The next will likely be collected as a 'Book of Vishnu'.

Credits 

The series is the creation of Deepak Chopra and is written by Saurav Mohapatra. This features art by many of Virgin Comics' artists like  Abhishek Singh (Ramayan 3392 A.D.), Satish Tayade (Kama Sutra) and others.

Plot summary

Issue #1: Ganesha
The first issue recounts the story of the birth of Ganesha, son of Shiva, who gave up his life for a promise made to his mother, Uma.

Issue #2: Kali
The second issue recounts the story of the awakening of Kali, an unstoppable destroyer, who was summoned by the gods to battle a demonic army.

Issue #3: Indra
The third issue recounts the story of the battle between Indra, king of the heavens, and the serpent demon Vritra.

Issue #4: Uma
The fourth issue recounts the story of Uma and her quest to win the heart of Shiva.

Issue #5: Shiva
This issue tells the story of Shiva, the destroyer, and the churning of the primordial ocean.

Issue #6: Vishnu (Narasimha Avatara)
This issue tells the story of Narasimha, the fourth incarnation of Vishnu, who defended the people of Earth against a demon overlord.

Issue #7: Yama
This issue tells the story of Yama, the lord of death, who rules over the underworld Naraka.

Issue #8: Garuda
This issue tells the story of Garuda, the mighty Eagle-headed god, the Avian warrior.

Issue #9: Kartikkeya
This issue tells the story of Kartikkeya, also called Murugan, the son of Shiva and Uma

Issue #10: Parshuram
This issue tells the story of Parashurama Bhargava, and his vendetta against the kings.

Issue #11: Hanuman
from the pages of Ramayana, the story of the mighty warrior Hanuman

Issue #12: Andhaka

Issue #13: Lakshmi

Issue #14: Saraswati

Issue #15: Krishna

Issue #16: The Saffron Princess
Created by: Deepak Chopra Written by: Yogesh Chandekar Art & Cover by: Virgin Studios When Prince Gulfaam rescues a huge, feral black panther, little does he know that he's on the brink of an unseen world where animals talk and a forgotten kingdom lies hidden deep in the woods. And it is here that fate will bring him face to face with the love of his life - the fabled 'Saffron Princess'. But what is love without a little peril? Ror the Saffron Princess has fallen prey to the evil schemes of a seasoned crook. And it is now up to Prince Gulfaam and his feline friend to foil the diabolical plan.

Critical reception 
The reception for this series has been generally positive .

Collected Editions
There are currently two volumes of collected editions available as trade paperbacks.

 India Authentic Vol 1 : Book of Shiva (Collecting issues #1-5) 
 India Authentic Vol 2 (Collecting issues #6-10)

See also
 Saurav Mohapatra
 Virgin Comics
 Indian comics
 Amar Chitra Katha

References

External links
 ComicCrique.com's review of INDIA AUTHENTIC #1-3
 Virgin Comics Press Release about INDIA AUTHENTIC
 Full summary of the first three issues
 India Authentic #1 / Ganesha Review at ComicPants.com
 India Authentic #1 Review at ComixFan.com
 India Authentic #1 / Ganesha Digital Edition at Virgin Comics
 Saurav Mohapatra's website
 Deepak Chopra's website

Comics by Saurav Mohapatra